Charles Marsham, 3rd Earl of Romney (30 July 1808 – 3 September 1874), styled Viscount Marsham between 1811 and 1845, was a British peer and Conservative Party politician.

Biography
Romney was the son of Charles Marsham, 2nd Earl of Romney, and Sophia, daughter of William Morton Pitt.

Romney was returned to Parliament as one of two representatives for Kent West in 1841, a seat he held until 1845 when he succeeded his father in the earldom and took his seat in the House of Lords.

Marriage & children
Lord Romney married Lady Margaret Harriett Montagu-Scott (born 12 June 1811, died 5 June 1846), youngest daughter of Charles Montagu-Scott, 4th Duke of Buccleuch, on 7 February 1832. They had three sons and one daughter:

 Lady Harriet Marsham (born 17 July 1838, died 14 November 1886)
 Charles Marsham, 4th Earl of Romney (born 7 March 1841, died 21 August 1905)
 The Rev and Hon John Marsham (born 25 July 1842, died 16 September 1926)
 Hon Henry Marsham (born 26 March 1845, died 1 July 1908)

Lady Romney died in London in June 1846, aged 34. Lord Romney remained a widower until his death in September 1874, aged 66. He was succeeded in the earldom by his eldest son, Charles.

References

External links 
 

1808 births
1874 deaths
Earls in the Peerage of the United Kingdom
Conservative Party (UK) MPs for English constituencies
UK MPs 1841–1847
UK MPs who inherited peerages